"Lifeloop" is a science fiction short story by American writer Orson Scott Card. It appears in his short story collections Capitol and The Worthing Saga. Card first published it in the October 1978 issue of Analog Science Fiction and Fact.

Plot summary
Although Arran Handully is the most popular lifeloop (reality show) actress on the planet Capitol she is sick of acting and wants to retire. Her manager tells her of an idea for one last lifeloop that will make her rich enough to quit. She suggests that Arran do a nonstop loop from the time she wakes up from suspended animation to the time she goes back to sleep using the fictional drug Somec twenty-one days later. Arran reluctantly agrees to this because she really wants to quit.

On the last day of filming, a famous lifeloop actor named Hamilton Ferlock comes to her apartment. Shortly after arriving, he breaks character, tells her that he loves her and asks her to marry him. She assumes that he is just doing this to play a trick on her and rejects him very coldly before going to the Sleeproom to be put under Somec. When she wakes up, she finds out that Hamilton committed suicide a week after she went to sleep. She also discovers that she really cared for him.

Connection to the Worthing Saga
This story uses several plot elements also used in The Worthing Saga, such as the sleeping drug Somec and the taping of memories. It takes place on the planet Capitol some time after the events in the story "Second Chance". At the beginning of the short story "Breaking the Game" there is a brief reference to a famous lifelooper committing suicide. Arran attempts to poison Jason Worthing and ends up being one of the colonists that goes with him to found a new world in chapter 5 of Card's novel The Worthing Chronicle.

Other editions
In 2005 "Lifeloop" appeared in Orson Scott Card's book Posing as People along with a play based on it by Aaron Johnson who co-authored the novel Invasive Procedures with Card.

See also

 List of works by Orson Scott Card
 Orson Scott Card
 Lifecasting (video stream)

External links 
 
 The official Orson Scott Card website

Short stories by Orson Scott Card
Works originally published in Analog Science Fiction and Fact
1978 short stories